The Shriver Farmstead is a historic farm located on County Line Road northwest of Virden, Illinois. Owner John Ryan built the farm's original buildings from 1858 to 1860. The farmhouse has an Italianate design which features a front porch supported by square posts, paired brackets below the eaves, pilasters at the corners, and a projecting gable above the entrance. The barn, one of two built for the farm, has a New World Dutch-inspired plan which incorporates elements of several barn styles. Dr. William Shriver purchased the farm in 1890, and his family has owned the property until very recently. It was part of the underground railroad.

The farm was added to the National Register of Historic Places on September 29, 1980.

References

Farms on the National Register of Historic Places in Illinois
Italianate architecture in Illinois
Buildings and structures in Macoupin County, Illinois
National Register of Historic Places in Macoupin County, Illinois